The Hon. Frederic Allsopp (21 September 1857 – 20 December 1928) was an English first-class cricketer who played for  Marylebone Cricket Club in 1884.

Allsopp was born at Hindlip Hall, Worcestershire, the son of the brewer Henry Allsopp, 1st Baron Hindlip. He was educated at Cheltenham College. In 1884 he played two first-class cricket matches for Marylebone Cricket Club   
His highest score of 34 came when playing for Marylebone Cricket Club in the match against Derbyshire County Cricket Club.   His best bowling of 1/8  came in the same match. He was a member of I Zingari and in 1911 he also played two games for Worcestershire second XI which were both against Warwickshire second XI.

Allsopp died at Hadzor House, Droitwich, Worcestershire at the age of 71. His brother Herbert Allsopp also played first-class cricket.

References

1857 births
1928 deaths
People educated at Cheltenham College
English cricketers
Marylebone Cricket Club cricketers
Cricketers from Gloucestershire